Topić (Serbian Cyrillic: Топић) is a Bosnian, Croatian and Serbian surname that may refer to the following notable people: 
Ante Topić Mimara (1898–1987), Croatian art collector and philanthropist
Angelina Topić (born 2005), Serbian high jumper
Biljana Topić (born 1977), Serbian triple jumper
Borislav Topić (born 1984), Bosnian football defender
Dado Topić (born 1949), Croatian rock musician
Dragutin Topić (born 1971), Serbian high jumper
Eldar Topić (born 1983), Bosnian football player
Goran Topić (born 1967), Serbian basketball coach and scout
Jadranko Topić (born 1949), Yugoslav football striker
Josip Topić (born 1982), Bosnian-Herzegovinian football player
Joško Topić (born 1983), Croatian tennis player
Milenko Topić (born 1969), Serbian basketball coach and former player 
Marko Topić (born 1976), Bosnian football forward
Mira Topić (born 1983), Croatian volleyball player
Mirko Topić (born 2001), Serbian football player
Nikola Topić (born 2005), Serbian basketball player 
Ognjen Topic (born 1986), Serbian-born American Muay Thai kickboxer
Velibor Topić (born 1970), Bosnian and British actor
Željko Topić (born 1959), Croatian civil servant 
Topic (DJ) (born 1992), German DJ, producer and musician

Bosnian surnames
Croatian surnames
Serbian surnames